It's All True may refer to:

It's All True (film), a 1942 unfinished film project by Orson Welles that was the subject of a 1993 documentary, It's All True: Based on an Unfinished Film by Orson Welles
It's All True (J Xaverre album), 2002
It's All True (Junior Boys album), 2011
"It's All True" (song), a 2007 song by Tracey Thorn
It's All True – International Documentary Film Festival, an annual film festival held in Brazil